is a game that was made for the Sega Saturn and Sega Titan ST-V arcade system, published in 1997. It was developed by a collaboration of Victor Interactive Software, and the Cave Company. The game was released by Victor Interactive Software in Japan and by Sega in other territories. Capcom released the arcade version. The game was met with positive reviews, drawing favorable comparison to other snowboarding video games for its sharp graphics, innovative design, and intuitive control system.

Gameplay
While UEP Systems' Cool Boarders system of executing moves is extremely regimented by a combo interface, Steep Slope Sliders allows the player far more autonomy. Instead of actually holding in a direction while jumping (similar to the system that the SSX snowboarding series uses), everything was based on the face buttons that were pressed, but the method of performing tricks was completely based on the Jamma configuration that was used in the arcades. Many other Sega arcade ports were like this as well, most notably Die Hard Arcade, Virtua Fighter: Remix, Virtua Fighter Kids, Radiant Silvergun and Winter Heat.

Reception

Steep Slope Sliders was met with positive reviews. The Saturn version held a 77% on the review aggregation website GameRankings based on four reviews. Critics praised the game for having varied course designs which accommodate exploration and experimentation, tight controls, numerous unlockables, and fast-moving graphics.

Game Informer concluded that Steep Slope Sliders was a strong entry in the snowboarding genre but still fell second to its competitor, the PlayStation's Cool Boarders 2. However, most critics held that Steep Slope Sliders had edged out Cool Boarders 2 as the superior snowboarding game. In particular, a number of reviews commented that Steep Slope Sliders has relatively little pop-up and polygon breakup, which was often cited as the biggest shortcoming of the Cool Boarders series. However, Joe Fielder of GameSpot argued that the biggest advantage Steep Slope Sliders holds over Cool Boarders 2 is that the controls are more accessible and easier to learn. At the same time, he concluded that the lack of a multiplayer mode or AI opponents to race against keep Steep Slope Sliders from being a truly great game instead of just a good one. The lack of multiplayer was a common criticism against the game.

Next Generation gave Steep Slope Sliders a strong recommendation, deeming it one of the deeper entries in the genre due to its innovative course design and tricks. Electronic Gaming Monthlys four-person review team similarly deemed it the most fun and replayable snowboarding game for consoles, with Shawn Smith going so far to say it was in his personal top ten Saturn games of all time. Sega Saturn Magazine called it "the most realistic and enjoyable translation of the sport to date." GamePro summed up that "A healthy variety of courses, fun gameplay, fast-moving graphics, and responsive controls make this an appealing game for snowboard aces and novices alike."

Sequel
Cave made a follow-up game called Trick'N Snowboarder, released in 1999.

Notes

References

External links

1997 video games
Arcade video games
Capcom games
Cave (company) games
Sega arcade games
Sega Saturn games
Sega video games
Snowboarding video games
Victor Interactive Software games
Video games developed in Japan
Multiplayer and single-player video games